Bleikvasslia is a village in Hemnes Municipality in Nordland county, Norway.

Bleikvasslia is a former mining community, but water started leaking into the mines therefore they no longer produce. Bleikvassli Church is located in this village. There is one gas station and store in the village.  There are two dams nearby that produce hydroelectric power.

There are many cabins scattered around the Bleikvasslia area that people from Korgen use as vacation homes. The  lake Røssvatnet lies just south of the village along the municipal border.

References

Hemnes
Villages in Nordland